Miller Valley is a small ice-free valley between Drury Ridge and Brown Ridge in the Neptune Range, Pensacola Mountains, Antarctica. it was mapped by the United States Geological Survey from surveys and U.S. Navy air photos, 1956–66, and was named by the Advisory Committee on Antarctic Names for Lieutenant Donald R. Miller, an LC-47 pilot with U.S. Navy Squadron VX-6, who flew logistical support for the Neptune Range field party in 1963–64.

References

Valleys of Queen Elizabeth Land